Cuthbert Tunstall (otherwise spelt Tunstal or Tonstall; 1474 – 18 November 1559) was an English Scholastic, church leader, diplomat, administrator and royal adviser. He served as Prince-Bishop of Durham during the reigns of Henry VIII, Edward VI, Mary I and Elizabeth I.

Childhood and early career
Cuthbert Tunstall was born at Hackforth near Bedale in North Yorkshire in 1474, an illegitimate son of Thomas Tunstall of Thurland Castle in Lancashire, who was later an esquire of the body of Richard III. His parents' subsequent marriage legitimized him under canon and civil law, if not under common law. His legitimate half-brother, Brian Tunstall, the so-called "stainless knight", was killed at the Battle of Flodden in 1513. Sir Walter Scott mentions "stainless Tunstall's banner white" in Canto Six, line 790 of Marmion.

Nothing is known of Tunstall's early life, except that he spent two years as a kitchen boy in the household of Sir Thomas Holland, perhaps at Lynn, Norfolk. He was admitted to Balliol College, Oxford, around 1491, where he studied mathematics, theology, and law. Around 1496 he became a scholar of the King's Hall, Cambridge. He did not receive a degree from either Oxford or Cambridge; he graduated from the University of Padua in 1505 as a Doctor of Civil Law and a Doctor of Canon Law. At Padua he studied under some of the leading humanists and became proficient in Greek and Hebrew.

William Warham, Archbishop of Canterbury, made Tunstall his chancellor on 25 August 1511, and shortly afterward appointed him rector of Harrow on the Hill. He became a canon of Lincoln in 1514, and archdeacon of Chester in 1515. Soon thereafter he was employed on diplomatic business by King Henry VIII and Cardinal Wolsey. In 1515, Tunstall was sent to Flanders with Sir Thomas More. At Brussels he met Erasmus as well, becoming the intimate friend of both scholars. In 1519, he was sent to Cologne; a visit to Worms (1520–21) gave him a sense of the significance held by the Lutheran movement and its literature.

Tunstall was made Master of the Rolls in 1516 and Dean of Salisbury in 1521. In 1522, he became Bishop of London by papal provision, and on 25 May 1523 he was made Lord Keeper of the Privy Seal. In 1525, he negotiated with the Holy Roman Emperor Charles V after the Battle of Pavia, and he helped to arrange the Peace of Cambrai in 1529.

Bishop of Durham under Henry VIII and Edward VI

On 22 February 1530–again by papal provision–Tunstall succeeded Cardinal Wolsey as Bishop of Durham. This role involved the assumption of quasi-regal power and authority within the territory of the diocese. In 1537 he was also made President of the new Council of the North. Although he was often engaged in time-consuming negotiations with the Scots, he took part in other public business and attended parliament, where in 1539 he participated in the discussion on the Bill of Six Articles.

In the question of King Henry's divorce, Tunstall acted as one of Queen Catherine's counselors. Unlike Bishop John Fisher and Sir Thomas More, Tunstall adopted a policy of passive obedience and acquiescence in many matters regarding which he likely had little support during the troubled years that followed the English Reformation. While Tunstall adhered firmly to Roman Catholic doctrine and practices, after some hesitation he accepted Henry as head of the Church of England, and he publicly defended this position, accepting a schism with Rome.

Tunstall disliked the religious policy pursued by the advisers of King Edward VI and voted against the first Act of Uniformity in 1549. However, he continued to discharge his public duties without interruption and hoped in vain that the Earl of Warwick might be convinced to reverse the anti-Catholic policy of the Duke of Somerset. After Somerset's fall, Tunstall was summoned to London in May 1551 and confined to his house there. During this captivity he composed a treatise on the Eucharist, which was published in Paris in 1554. At the end of 1551 he was imprisoned in the Tower of London, and a bill for his deprivation was introduced into the House of Commons. When this failed, he was tried by a commission on 4–5 October 1552 and deprived of his bishopric.

Bishop of Durham under Mary I and Elizabeth I
On the ascension of the Catholic Queen Mary I to the throne in 1553, Tunstall was granted liberty. His bishopric, which had been dissolved by Act of Parliament in March 1553, was re-established by a further Act in April 1554. Tunstall assumed his office as Bishop of Durham once more. He maintained his earlier conciliatory approach, indulging in no systematic persecution of Protestants. Through Mary's reign he ruled his diocese in peace.

When the Protestant Elizabeth I ascended to the throne, Tunstall refused to take the Oath of Supremacy and would not participate in the consecration of the Anglican Matthew Parker as Archbishop of Canterbury. He was arrested, deprived again of his diocese in September 1559, and held prisoner at Lambeth Palace, where he died within a few weeks, aged 85. He was one of eleven Roman Catholic bishops to die in custody during Elizabeth's reign.

He was buried in the parish church of St Mary-at-Lambeth, now a deconsecrated building.

The Anglican historian Albert F. Pollard wrote:

Works
 De arte supputandi libri quattuor (1522)
Based on the Summa of Luca Pacioli, this was the first printed work published in England that was devoted exclusively to mathematics.
 Confutatio cavillationum quibus SS. Eucharistiae Sacramentum ab impiis Caphernaitis impeti solet (Paris, 1552)
 De veritate corporis et sanguinis domini nostri Jesu Christi in eucharistia (Paris, 1554)
 Compendium in decem libros ethicorum Aristotelis (Paris, 1554)
 Certaine godly and devout prayers made in Latin by C. Tunstall and translated into Englishe by Thomas Paynelle, Clerke (London, 1558).
 Tunstall's correspondence as president of the Council of the North is in the British Library.

See also
James Stonnes (b. 1513; d. after 1585) Catholic priest, ordained by Tunstall in 1539

Notes

References

External links

1474 births
1559 deaths
People from Hambleton District
Lords Privy Seal
Bishops of Durham
Bishops of London
Latin commentators on Aristotle
Deans of Salisbury
Archdeacons of Chester
Masters of the Rolls
16th-century English Roman Catholic bishops